Louis Quételart (27 March 1888 – 19 August 1950) was one of the most famous villa architects of the 1920s and 1930s in France. Most of his work is to be seen in Le Touquet-Paris-Plage.

See also
 Le Touquet-Paris-Plage
 Villa La Prairie

References

1888 births
1950 deaths
20th-century French architects
Le Touquet